Edmund Emil Kemper III (born December 18, 1948) is an American serial killer who murdered a total of 10 people, including a 15-year-old girl, as well as his own mother and her best friend, from May 1972 to April 1973, following his parole for murdering his paternal grandparents. Kemper was nicknamed the Co-ed Killer, as most of his victims were female college students hitchhiking in the vicinity of Santa Cruz County, California. Most of his murders included necrophilia, with some incidents of rape.

Born in Burbank, California, Kemper had a troubled upbringing. His parents divorced in early life; as a child, he moved to Montana with his mother Clarnell, who kept Kemper locked in their basement which had been frequented by rats. He ran away to reunite with his father, but he had remarried around Christmas of 1963 and sent Edmund to stay with his paternal grandparents in North Fork, California. It was there, in August 1964 at the age of 15, that he murdered them. Following the murders, Kemper was briefly diagnosed with paranoid schizophrenia by court psychiatrists and sentenced to the Atascadero State Hospital as a criminally insane juvenile.

Released at the age of 21 after convincing psychiatrists he was rehabilitated, the 6'9" Kemper was reportedly regarded as non-threatening by his future victims. He targeted young female hitchhikers during his killing spree, luring them into his vehicle and driving them to secluded areas where he would murder them before taking their corpses back to his home to be decapitated, dismembered, and violated. Kemper then murdered his mother and one of her friends before turning himself in to the authorities.

Found sane and guilty at his trial in 1973, Kemper requested the death penalty for his crimes. Capital punishment was suspended in California at the time, and he instead received eight concurrent life sentences. Since then, he has been incarcerated in the California Medical Facility in Vacaville.

Notably, Kemper and Herbert Mullin overlapped in their 1972 to 1973 murder sprees, adding confusion to the police investigations and ending with both being arrested, within a few weeks of each other, after the deaths of 21 people.

Early life
Edmund Emil Kemper III was born in Burbank, California, on December 18, 1948. He was the middle child and only son born to Clarnell Elizabeth Kemper (née Stage, 1921–1973) and Edmund Emil Kemper Jr. (1919–1985). Edmund Jr. was a World War II veteran who, after the war, tested nuclear weapons at the Pacific Proving Grounds before returning to California, where he worked as an electrician. Clarnell often complained about her husband's "menial" electrician job. Edmund Jr. later stated that "suicide missions in wartime and the atomic bomb testings were nothing compared to living with [Clarnell]" and that she affected him "more than three hundred and ninety-six days and nights of fighting on the front did."

Weighing  as a newborn, Kemper was a head taller than his peers by the age of four. Early on, he exhibited antisocial behavior such as torture of insects and cruelty to animals: at the age of 10, he buried a pet cat alive; once it died, he dug it up, decapitated it, and mounted its head on a spike. Kemper later stated that he derived pleasure from successfully lying to his family about killing the cat. At the age of 13, he killed another family cat when he perceived it to be favoring his younger sister, Allyn Lee Kemper (b. 1951), over him; he kept pieces of it in his closet until his mother found them.

Kemper had a dark fantasy life. He performed rites with his younger sister's dolls that culminated in his removing their heads and hands; on one occasion, when his elder sister, Susan Hughey Kemper (1943–2014), teased him and asked why he did not try to kiss his teacher, he replied, "If I kiss her, I'd have to kill her first." He also recalled that as a young boy, he would sneak out of his house and, armed with his father's bayonet, go to his second-grade teacher's house to watch her through the windows. He stated in later interviews that some of his favorite games to play as a child were "Gas Chamber" and "Electric Chair", in which he asked his younger sister to tie him up and flip an imaginary switch; he would then tumble over and writhe on the floor, pretending that he was being executed by gas inhalation or electric shock. He also had close-to-death experiences as a child: once, when his elder sister tried to push him in front of a train and another time when she successfully pushed him into the deep end of a swimming pool, where he almost drowned.

Kemper had a close relationship with his father and was notably devastated when his parents divorced in 1957, causing him to be raised by Clarnell in Helena, Montana. He had a severely dysfunctional relationship with his mother, a neurotic, domineering alcoholic who frequently belittled, humiliated, and abused him. She also refused to show him affection out of fear that she would "turn him gay" and told the young Kemper that he reminded her of his father and that no woman would ever love him. Kemper later described her as a "sick angry woman," and it has been postulated that she had borderline personality disorder.

At the age of 14, Kemper ran away from home in an attempt to reconcile with his father in Van Nuys, California. Once there, he learned that his father had remarried and had a stepson. Kemper stayed with his father for a short while until the elder Kemper sent him to live with his paternal grandparents, who lived on a ranch in the foothills of the Sierra Nevada on Road 224, about two miles west of the town of North Fork. Kemper hated living in North Fork; he described his grandfather as "senile" and said that his grandmother "was constantly emasculating me and my grandfather."

First murders
On August 27, 1964, at the age of 15, Kemper was sitting at the kitchen table with his grandmother Maude Matilda (Hughey) Kemper (b. 1897) when they had an argument. Enraged, Kemper stormed off and retrieved a rifle that his grandfather had given him for hunting; the rifle had been confiscated because he used it to needlessly shoot animals. He then re-entered the kitchen and fatally shot his grandmother in the head before firing twice more into her back. His grandmother's last words reportedly were, "Oh, you'd better not be shooting the birds again." Some accounts mention that she also suffered multiple post-mortem stab wounds with a kitchen knife. When Kemper's grandfather, Edmund Emil Kemper Sr. (b. 1892), returned from grocery shopping, Kemper went outside and fatally shot him in the driveway next to his car. He was unsure of what to do next, so he phoned his mother, who told him to contact the local police. Kemper did so and waited to be taken into custody.

After his arrest, Kemper said that he "just wanted to see what it felt like to kill Grandma", and testified that he killed his grandfather so he would not have to find out that his wife was dead, and that he would be angry with Kemper for what he'd done. Psychiatrist Donald Lunde, who interviewed Kemper during adulthood, wrote, "In his way, he had avenged the rejection of both his father and his mother." Kemper's crimes were deemed incomprehensible for a 15-year-old to commit, and court psychiatrists diagnosed him with paranoid schizophrenia. He was sent to Atascadero State Hospital, a maximum-security facility in San Luis Obispo County that houses mentally-ill convicts.

Imprisonment
At Atascadero, California Youth Authority psychiatrists and social workers disagreed with the court psychiatrists' diagnoses. Their reports stated that Kemper showed "no flight of ideas, no interference with thought, no expression of delusions or hallucinations, and no evidence of bizarre thinking." They also observed him to be intelligent and introspective. Initial testing measured his IQ at 136, over two standard deviations above average. Kemper was re-diagnosed with a less severe condition, a "personality trait disturbance, passive-aggressive type." Later on in his time at Atascadero, he was given another IQ test, which gave a higher result of 145.

Kemper endeared himself to his psychiatrists by being a model prisoner, and he was trained to administer psychiatric tests to other inmates. A psychiatrist later said, "He was a very good worker[,] and this is not typical of a sociopath. He really took pride in his work." Kemper also became a member of the Jaycees while in Atascadero and claimed to have developed "some new tests and some new scales on the Minnesota Multiphasic Personality Inventory," specifically an "Overt Hostility Scale", during his work with Atascadero psychiatrists. After his second arrest, Kemper said that being able to understand how these tests functioned allowed him to manipulate his psychiatrists, admitting that he learned a lot from the sex offenders to whom he administered tests.

Release and time between murders
On December 18, 1969, his 21st birthday, Kemper was released on parole from Atascadero. Against the recommendations of psychiatrists at the hospital, he was released into the care of his mother Clarnell —who had remarried, taken the surname Strandberg, and then divorced again— in Aptos, California, a short drive from where she worked as an administrative assistant at the University of California, Santa Cruz (UCSC). Kemper later demonstrated further to his psychiatrists that he was rehabilitated and on November 29, 1972, his juvenile records were permanently expunged. The last report from his probation psychiatrists read:

Kemper maintained relationships with Santa Cruz police officers despite his rejection from joining the force and became a self-described "friendly nuisance" at a bar called the Jury Room, a popular hangout for local cops.

Kemper worked a series of menial jobs before gaining employment with the State of California Division of Highways. During this time, his relationship with Clarnell remained toxic and hostile, the two having frequent arguments that their neighbors often overheard. Kemper later described the arguments he had with his mother around this time, stating the following:

When he had saved enough money, Kemper moved out to live with a friend in Alameda. There, he still complained of being unable to get away from his mother because she regularly phoned him and paid him surprise visits. He often had financial difficulties, which resulted in his frequently returning to his mother's apartment in Aptos. At a Santa Cruz beach, Kemper met a student from Turlock High School to whom he became engaged in March 1973. The engagement was broken off after Kemper's second arrest, and his fiancée's parents requested her name not be revealed to the public.

The same year that he began working for the Highway Division, Kemper was hit by a car while riding a motorcycle that he had recently purchased. His arm was badly injured in the crash, and he received a $15,000 settlement in the civil suit he filed against the car's driver. As he was driving around in the 1969 Ford Galaxie he bought with part of his settlement money, he noticed a large number of young women hitchhiking and began storing plastic bags, knives, blankets and handcuffs in his car. He then began picking up young women and peacefully letting them go. According to Kemper, he picked up around 150 such hitchhikers before he felt homicidal sexual urges, which he called his "little zapples," and began acting on them.

Later murders
Between May 1972 and April 1973, Kemper killed eight people — all women. He would pick up female students who were hitchhiking and take them to isolated areas where he would shoot, stab, smother, or strangle them. He would then take their bodies back to his home, where he decapitated them, performed irrumatio on their severed heads, had sexual intercourse with their corpses, and then dismembered them.

During this 11-month murder spree, Kemper killed five college students, one high school student, his mother, and his mother's best friend. Kemper has stated in interviews that he often searched for victims after having arguments with his mother and that she refused to introduce him to women attending the university where she worked. He recalled: "She would say, 'You're just like your father. You don't deserve to get to know them'." Psychiatrists, and Kemper himself, have espoused the belief that the young women were surrogates for his ultimate target: his mother.

Mary Ann Pesce and Anita Luchessa

On May 7, 1972, Kemper was driving in Berkeley, when he picked up two 18-year-old hitchhiking students from Fresno State University, Mary Ann Pesce and Anita Mary Luchessa, with the pretense of taking them to Stanford University. After driving for an hour, he managed to reach a secluded wooded area near Alameda, with which he was familiar from his work at the Highway Department, without alerting his passengers that he had changed directions from where they wanted to go. It was there that he handcuffed Pesce and locked Luchessa in the trunk, then stabbed and strangled Pesce to death, subsequently killing Luchessa in a similar manner. Kemper later confessed that while handcuffing Pesce, he "brushed the back of [his] hand against one of her breasts and it embarrassed [him]", adding that he said, "'Whoops, I'm sorry' or something like that" after grazing her breast, despite murdering her minutes later.

Kemper put both of the women's bodies in the trunk of his Ford Galaxie and returned to his apartment. He was stopped on the way by a police officer for having a broken taillight, but the officer did not detect the corpses in the car. Kemper's roommate was not at home, so he took the bodies into his apartment, where he photographed and had sexual intercourse with the naked corpses before dismembering them. He then put the body parts into plastic bags, which he later abandoned near Loma Prieta Mountain. Before disposing of Pesce's and Luchessa's severed heads in a ravine, Kemper engaged in irrumatio with both of them. In August of that year, Pesce's skull was found on Loma Prieta Mountain. An extensive search failed to turn up the rest of Pesce's remains or a trace of Luchessa.

Aiko Koo

On the evening of September 14, 1972, Kemper picked up a 15-year-old dance student named Aiko Koo, who had decided to hitchhike to a dance class after missing her bus. He again drove to a remote area, where he pulled a gun on Koo before accidentally locking himself out of his car. However, Koo let him back inside, despite the fact that the gun was still in the car. Back inside the car, he proceeded to choke her unconscious, rape her, and kill her.

Kemper subsequently packed Koo's body into the trunk of his car and went to a nearby bar to have a few drinks, then returned to his apartment. He later confessed that after exiting the bar, he opened the trunk of his car, "admiring [his] catch like a fisherman." Back at his apartment, he had sexual intercourse with the corpse, then dismembered and disposed of the remains in a similar manner as his previous two victims. Koo's mother called the police to report the disappearance of her daughter and put up hundreds of flyers asking for information, but she did not receive any responses regarding her daughter's location or status.

Cindy Schall
On January 7, 1973, Kemper, who had moved back in with his mother, was driving around the Cabrillo College campus when he picked up 18-year-old student Cynthia Anne "Cindy" Schall. He drove to a wooded area and fatally shot her with a .22 caliber pistol. He then placed her body in the trunk of his car and drove to his mother's house, where he kept her body hidden in a closet in his room overnight. When his mother left for work the next morning, he had sexual intercourse with and removed the bullet from Schall's corpse, then dismembered and decapitated her in his mother's bathtub.

Kemper kept Schall's severed head for several days, regularly engaging in irrumatio with it, then buried it in his mother's garden facing upward toward her bedroom. After his arrest, he stated that he did this because his mother "always wanted people to look up to her." He discarded the rest of Schall's remains by throwing them off a cliff. Over the course of the following few weeks, all except Schall's head and right hand were discovered and "pieced together like a macabre jigsaw puzzle." A pathologist determined that Schall had been cut into pieces with a power saw.

Rosalind Thorpe and Allison Liu 

On February 5, 1973, after a heated argument with his mother, Kemper left his house in search of possible victims. With heightened suspicion of a serial killer preying on hitchhikers in the Santa Cruz area, students had been advised to accept rides only from cars with university stickers on them. Kemper was able to obtain a sticker, as his mother worked at UCSC. He encountered 23-year-old Rosalind Heather Thorpe and 20-year-old Alice Helen "Allison" Liu on the UCSC campus. According to Kemper, Thorpe entered his car first, reassuring Liu to also enter. He first fatally shot Thorpe and then Liu with his pistol and wrapped their bodies in blankets.

Kemper again brought his victims back to his mother's house; this time he beheaded them in his car and carried the headless corpses into his mother's house to have sexual intercourse with them. He then dismembered the bodies, removed the bullets to prevent identification, and discarded their remains the next morning. Some remains were found at Eden Canyon a week later, and more were found near Route 1 in March.

When questioned in an interview as to why he decapitated his victims, he explained: "The head trip fantasies were a bit like a trophy. You know, the head is where everything is at, the brain, eyes, mouth. That's the person. I remember being told as a kid, you cut off the head and the body dies. The body is nothing after the head is cut off ... well, that's not quite true, there's a lot left in the girl's body without the head."

Clarnell (Kemper) Strandberg and Sally Hallett
On April 20, 1973, after coming home from a party, 52-year-old Clarnell Strandberg awakened her son with her arrival. While sitting in her bed reading a book, she noticed Kemper enter her room and said to him, "I suppose you're going to want to sit up all night and talk now." Kemper replied, "No, good night." He then waited for her to fall asleep, then he snuck back into her room to bludgeon her with a claw hammer and slit her throat with a penknife. He then decapitated her and engaged in irrumatio with her severed head, then used it as a dart board. Kemper stated that he "put [her head] on a shelf and screamed at it for an hour ... threw darts at it," and, ultimately, "smashed her face in." He also cut out her tongue and larynx and put them in the garbage disposal. However, the garbage disposal could not break down the tough vocal cords and ejected the tissue back into the sink. "That seemed appropriate, as much as she'd bitched and screamed and yelled at me over so many years", Kemper later said.

Kemper hid his mother's corpse in a closet and went to drink at a nearby bar. Upon his return, he invited his mother's best friend, 59-year-old Sara Taylor "Sally" Hallett, over to the house to have dinner and watch a movie. When Hallett arrived, Kemper strangled her to death to create a cover story that his mother and Hallett had gone away together on vacation. He subsequently put Hallett's corpse in a closet, obscured any outward signs of a disturbance, and left a note to the police. It read:

Afterward, Kemper fled the scene. He drove non-stop to Pueblo, Colorado, taking caffeine pills to stay awake for the over 1,000-mile (about 1,600 km) journey. He had three guns and hundreds of rounds of ammunition in his car, and he believed he was the target of an active manhunt. After not hearing any news on the radio about the murders of his mother and Hallett when he arrived in Pueblo, he found a phone booth and called the police. He confessed to the murders of his mother and Hallett, but the police did not take his call seriously and told him to call back at a later time. Several hours later, Kemper called again, asking to speak to an officer he personally knew. He confessed to that officer of killing his mother and Hallett, then waited for the police to arrive and take him into custody. Upon his capture, Kemper also confessed to the murders of the six students.

When asked in a later interview why he turned himself in, Kemper said: "The original purpose was gone ... It wasn't serving any physical or real or emotional purpose. It was just a pure waste of time ... Emotionally, I couldn't handle it much longer. Toward the end there, I started feeling the folly of the whole damn thing, and at the point of near exhaustion, near collapse, I just said to hell with it and called it all off."

Trial

Kemper was indicted on eight counts of first-degree murder on May 7, 1973. He was assigned the Chief Public Defender of Santa Cruz County, attorney Jim Jackson. Due to Kemper's explicit and detailed confession, his counsel's only option was to plead not guilty by reason of insanity to the charges. Kemper twice tried to commit suicide in custody. His trial went ahead on October 23, 1973.

Three court-appointed psychiatrists found Kemper to be legally sane. One of the psychiatrists, Dr. Joel Fort, investigated his juvenile records and the diagnosis that he was once psychotic. Fort also interviewed Kemper, including under truth serum, and relayed to the court that Kemper had engaged in cannibalism, alleging that he sliced flesh from the legs of his victims, then cooked and consumed these strips of flesh in a casserole. Nevertheless, Fort determined that Kemper was fully cognizant in each case and stated that Kemper enjoyed the prospect of the infamy associated with being labeled a murderer. Kemper later recanted the confession of cannibalism.

California used the M'Naghten standard, which held that for a defendant to "establish a defense on the ground of insanity, it must be clearly proved that, at the time of the committing of the act, the party accused was laboring under such a defect of reason, from disease of mind, and not to know the nature and quality of the act he was doing; or if he did know it, that he did not know he was doing what was wrong." Kemper appeared to have known that the nature of his acts was wrong, and he had shown signs of malice aforethought. On November 1, Kemper took the stand. He testified that he killed the victims because he wanted them "for myself, like possessions", and attempted to convince the jury that he was insane based on the reasoning that his actions could have been committed only by someone with an aberrant mind. He said that two beings inhabited his body and that when the killer personality took over, it was "kind of like blacking out."

On November 8, 1973, the six-man, six-woman jury deliberated for five hours before declaring Kemper sane and guilty on all counts. He asked for the death penalty, requesting "death by torture." However, with a moratorium placed on capital punishment by the Supreme Court of California, he instead received seven years to life for each count, with these terms to be served concurrently, and was sentenced to the California Medical Facility in Vacaville.

Imprisonment
In the California Medical Facility, Kemper was incarcerated in the same prison block as other notorious criminals such as Herbert Mullin and Charles Manson. Kemper showed particular disdain for Mullin, who committed his murders at the same time and in the same area as Kemper. He described Mullin as "just a cold-blooded killer... killing everybody he saw for no good reason." Kemper stated that "[Mullin] had a habit of singing and bothering people when somebody tried to watch TV, so I threw water on him to shut him up. Then, when he was a good boy, I'd give him peanuts. Herbie liked peanuts. That was effective because pretty soon he asked permission to sing. That's called behavior modification treatment."

Kemper remains among the general population in prison and is considered a model prisoner. He was in charge of scheduling other inmates' appointments with psychiatrists and was an accomplished craftsman of ceramic cups. He was also a prolific narrator of audiobooks; a 1987 Los Angeles Times article stated that he was the coordinator of the prison's program and had personally spent over 5,000 hours narrating books with several hundred completed recordings to his name. Kemper was retired from these positions in 2015 after he experienced a stroke and was declared medically disabled. He received his first rules violation report in 2016 for failing to provide a urine sample.

While imprisoned, Kemper has participated in a number of interviews, including a segment in the 1982 documentary The Killing of America, as well as an appearance in the 1984 documentary Murder: No Apparent Motive. His interviews have contributed to the understanding of the mind of serial killers. FBI profiler John Douglas described Kemper as "among the brightest" prison inmates he interviewed and capable of "rare insight for a violent criminal." He further added that he personally liked Kemper, referring to him as "friendly, open, sensitive, [and having] a good sense of humor."

Kemper is forthcoming about the nature of his crimes and has stated that he participated in the interviews to save others like himself from killing. At the end of his Murder: No Apparent Motive interview, he said, "There's somebody out there that is watching this and hasn't done that — hasn't killed people, and wants to, and rages inside and struggles with that feeling, or is so sure they have it under control. They need to talk to somebody about it. Trust somebody enough to sit down and talk about something that isn't a crime; thinking that way isn't a crime. Doing it isn't just a crime; it's a horrible thing. It doesn't know when to quit, and it can't be stopped easily once it starts." He also conducted an interview with French writer Stéphane Bourgoin in 1991.

Kemper was first eligible for parole in 1979. He was denied parole that year, as well as at parole hearings in 1980, 1981, and 1982. He subsequently waived his right to a hearing in 1985. He was denied parole at his 1988 hearing, where he said, "Society is not ready in any shape or form for me. I can't fault them for that." He was denied parole again in 1991 and in 1994. He then waived his right to a hearing in 1997 and in 2002. He attended the next hearing in 2007, where he was again denied parole. Prosecutor Ariadne Symons said, "We don't care how much of a model prisoner he is because of the enormity of his crimes." Kemper waived his right to a hearing again in 2012. He was denied parole in 2017 and is next eligible in 2024.

Psychology
While on trial for murdering his grandparents, Kemper was diagnosed with paranoid schizophrenia by court-appointed psychiatrists; however, California Youth Authority psychiatrists and social workers at Atascadero State Hospital disagreed on the basis that Kemper showed "no flight of ideas, no interference with thought, no expression of delusions or hallucinations, and no evidence of bizarre thinking", further observing him to be highly intelligent and introspective. Kemper was therefore re-diagnosed with "personality trait disturbance, passive-aggressive type." Shortly after arriving at California Medical Facility in 1973, Kemper was admitted to psychiatrists for re-evaluation. He was re-diagnosed with antisocial, narcissistic, and schizotypal personality disorders.

In popular culture
Kemper has influenced many works of film and literature. He and Ed Gein were used as an inspiration for the character of Buffalo Bill in Thomas Harris's 1988 novel The Silence of the Lambs. Like Kemper, Bill fatally shoots his grandparents as a teenager. Dean Koontz cited Kemper as an inspiration for character Edgler Vess in his 1996 novel Intensity. The character Patrick Bateman in the 2000 film American Psycho mistakenly attributes a quote by Kemper to Gein, saying: "You know what Ed Gein said about women? ... He said 'When I see a pretty girl walking down the street, I think two things. One part of me wants to take her out, talk to her, be real nice and sweet and treat her right ... [the other part wonders] what her head would look like on a stick'."

A direct-to-video horror film loosely based on Kemper's murders, titled Kemper: The CoEd Killer, was released in 2008. In 2012, French author Marc Dugain published a novel, Avenue des géants (Avenue of the Giants), about Kemper. Kemper was portrayed by 6'5" actor Cameron Britton in three episodes (nos. 2, 3 and 10) of the first season of the 2017 Netflix television drama series Mindhunter, surrounding FBI research of the criminally insane. Britton received a nomination for the Primetime Emmy Award for Outstanding Guest Actor in a Drama Series because of this role, and appeared in the fifth episode of the second season.

Kemper has been the subject of multiple books, including Edmund Kemper: The True Story of the Co-Ed Killer, Edmund Kemper: The True Story of the Brutal Co-ed Butcher, and The Co‑Ed Killer: A Study of the Murders, Mutilations, and Matricide of Edmund Kemper III, among others.

Extracts from Kemper's interviews have been used in numerous songs, including "Love // Hate" by Dystopia, "Abomination Unseen" by Devourment, "Forever" by The Berzerker, "Severed Head" by Suicide Commando, "New Flesh" by Pitchshifter, and "Crave" by Optimum Wound Profile. He is discussed in many songs, such as "Edmund Kemper Had a Horrible Temper" by Macabre, "Fortress" by System of a Down, "Temper Temper Mr. Kemper" by The Celibate Rifles, "Murder" by Seabound, "Killfornia (Ed Kemper)" by Church of Misery, and "Edmund Temper" by Amigo the Devil.

See also 
List of serial killers in the United States
List of serial killers by number of victims

Notes

References

Bibliography

External links

1948 births
American people convicted of murder
American prisoners sentenced to life imprisonment
American murderers of children
American rapists
American serial killers
Human trophy collecting
Living people
Male serial killers
Matricides
Minors convicted of murder
Necrophiles
People convicted of murder by California
People from Aptos, California
People from Burbank, California
People with antisocial personality disorder
People with narcissistic personality disorder
People with schizotypal personality disorder
People with passive-aggressive personality disorder
Prisoners sentenced to life imprisonment by California